The 1984 Major League Baseball postseason was the playoff tournament of Major League Baseball for the 1984 season. The winners of each division advance to the postseason and face each other in a League Championship Series to determine the pennant winners that face each other in the World Series. 

In the American League, the Detroit Tigers returned to the postseason for the first time since 1972, and the Kansas City Royals returned to the postseason for the sixth time in nine years. In the National League, the Chicago Cubs were making their first postseason appearance since the 1945 World Series, and the San Diego Padres made their first postseason appearance in franchise history.

The playoffs began on October 2, 1984, and concluded on October 14, 1984, with the Tigers defeating the Padres in five games in the 1984 World Series. This was the first title since 1968 for the Tigers and their fourth overall.

Playoff seeds
The following teams qualified for the postseason:

American League
 Detroit Tigers - 104–58, Clinched AL East
 Kansas City Royals - 84–78, Clinched AL West

National League
 Chicago Cubs - 96–65, Clinched NL East
 San Diego Padres - 92–70, Clinched NL West

Playoff bracket

American League Championship Series

Detroit Tigers vs. Kansas City Royals

The Tigers swept the Royals to return to the World Series for the first time since 1968. 

Jack Morris and closer Willie Hernández had solid pitching performances as the Tigers blew out the Royals in Game 1 on the road. In Game 2, the Tigers held a 3-2 lead going into the bottom of the eighth, but Hernández surrendered the tying run as Hal McRae tied the game with an RBI double. However, the Tigers still prevailed as "Senor Smoke", Aurelio López, held the Royals scoreless in the ninth, tenth and eleventh innings, and Johnny Grubb hit a double off Dan Quisenberry in the 11th inning to drive in Darrell Evans and Ruppert Jones for the game winning runs. When the series shifted to Detroit for Game 3, the Royals' Charlie Leibrandt pitched a complete game, but it wasn't enough as the Tigers won 1-0, off an RBI single from Marty Castillo which drove in Chet Lemon. This was the last time the Tigers won the AL pennant while playing at Tiger Stadium.

The Royals would return to the ALCS the next year, where they overcame a 3-1 series deficit against the Toronto Blue Jays en route to a World Series title. This was the last AL pennant won by the Tigers until 2006, where they swept the Oakland Athletics before falling in the World Series.

National League Championship Series

San Diego Padres vs. Chicago Cubs

This was the first postseason series for the Padres, as well as the first for the Cubs since the 1945 World Series. The Cubs jumped out to a 2-0 lead in the series, but the Padres came back to win three straight, advancing to the World Series for the first time in franchise history (in the process denying a rematch of the 1945 World Series between the Tigers and Cubs). 

At first, it appeared as if this series would go Chicago's way. The Cubs embarrassed the Padres in a 13-0 rout in Game 1, and held off a rally by the Padres in Game 2 to take a 2-0 lead headed to San Diego. Then, things went south for the Cubs. Ed Whitson and closer Rich Gossage held the Cubs' offense to just one run scored as the Padres blew out the Cubs in Game 3, winning their first postseason game in franchise history. Game 4 was a shootout that the Padres won 7-5 thanks to a walk-off two-run home run from Steve Garvey, evening the series. In Game 3, the Cubs held a 3-0 lead after five innings, but the Padres responded with six unanswered runs across the sixth and seventh innings respectively to prevail 6-3 and clinch their first NL pennant. The Cubs' collapse in this series contributed to the popular mythology of the Curse of the Billy Goat.

This was the first of four consecutive losses in the NLCS for the Cubs - in 1989 they fell to the San Francisco Giants in five games, in 2003 they blew a 3 games to 1 series lead to the Florida Marlins, and in 2015 they were swept by the New York Mets. The Cubs wouldn't win their next pennant until 2016, where they went on to win the World Series.

The Padres would win the NL pennant again in 1998, against the Atlanta Braves in six games.

1984 World Series

Detroit Tigers (AL) vs. San Diego Padres (NL) 

This was the first (and currently only) World Series in which the Tigers faced an expansion team. The Tigers defeated the Padres in five games to win their first championship since 1968, ending a 16-year championship drought for not just the Tigers, but the city of Detroit in general.

In San Diego, the Tigers took Game 1 off a complete game performance from Jack Morris. In Game 2, the Tigers held a 3-2 lead after the top of the fifth, but Kurt Bevacqua won the game for the Padres with a three-run home run off Tigers' starting pitcher Dan Petry, evening the series headed to Detroit. Game 2 remains the only World Series game won by the Padres. When the series shifted to Detroit for Game 3, the Tigers jumped out to a big lead early and maintained it, as Willie Hernández shut out the Padres in the final two innings to give the Tigers a 5-2 victory and the series lead. Jack Morris pitched yet another complete game in Game 4 as the Tigers won 4-2, taking a 3-1 series lead. Game 5 was an offensive duel which was won by the Tigers as they clinched the title with a series-sealing three-run home run by Kirk Gibson in the bottom of the eighth inning.

The 1984 World Series marked the start of a successful period for Michigan-based professional sports teams against their California counterparts. In the years following the Tigers' World Series victory, the NBA's Detroit Pistons defeated the Los Angeles Lakers in the NBA Finals in 1989 and 2004, the NHL's Detroit Red Wings defeated the Anaheim Ducks, Los Angeles Kings, and San Jose Sharks in the Stanley Cup playoffs in 1995, 1997, 2000, 2007, 2009, and 2013, and the Tigers would defeat the Oakland Athletics in the MLB Postseason in 2006, 2012, and 2013.

This would be the last postseason appearance for the Padres until 1996. The Padres would return to the World Series in 1998, but were swept by the New York Yankees, becoming the first victim of a Yankees three-peat from 1998 to 2000. 

This is to date the last World Series won by the Tigers. The Tigers would return to the postseason in 1987, but were upset by the Minnesota Twins in five games in the ALCS. The Tigers would return to the World Series in 2006 and 2012, but lost both to the St. Louis Cardinals and San Francisco Giants respectively.

References

External links
 League Baseball Standings & Expanded Standings - 1984

 
Major League Baseball postseason